Jean Daret (1613–1668) was a Flemish artist.

Biography
Jean Daret was born in Brussels in 1613.

He was appointed an official painter for King Louis XIV. He specialised in decorating mansions, namely Chateau de Chateaurenard, at Rue Gaston Saporta, in Aix-en-Provence.

He died in Aix-en-Provence at age 55.

Legacy
Rue [street] Jean Daret in Aix-en-Provence is named after him.

References

External links
Paintings by Jean Daret
Self-portrait by Jean Daret

1613 births
1668 deaths
Artists from Brussels
17th-century French painters
French male painters